Crane Sports Football Club were a football club based in Ipswich, Suffolk, England.

History
The club joined the Suffolk & Ipswich League prior to World War II, winning Division Three in 1935–36. They won the Suffolk Senior Cup in 1971 and 1974, and the following season won the Senior Division of the Suffolk & Ipswich League in 1974–75. They won the Senior Cup again in 1982 and 1984, and also entered the FA Vase for three seasons during the 1980s, reaching the second round in 1983–84 after defeating Arlesey Town in what the Ipswich Evening Star described 25 years later as "memorable matches".

After dropping into the lower divisions of the SIL, the club won Division Three in 1998–99 and Division One in 2001–02 to return to the Senior Division. In 2004–05 they won the League Cup for the first time. They won the Senior Division title in 2014–15, retaining the title the following season.

In April 2021 Crane Sports announced they would be folding, due to "commercial, financial and logistical factors".

Ground
From the early 1960s to the 1980s, the club was the regular venue for the Suffolk county hockey team's matches. According to ''The Times correspondent, it had "a well-kept pitch with good drainage and the amenities are superb. Suffolk have been using this ground for 19 years and it is believed to be lucky for them". After the ground was taken over by Ipswich Town in 1998, the club had to share facilities; they moved to their current home, Greshams Sports Ground, before the 2010–11 season.

Between 1966 and 1998, the club played host to an annual seven-a-side invitational football tournament, the "Crane Summer Sevens", to be revived in 2011. Among the early winners were Ipswich Town, whose team included future England national team captain Mick Mills.

HonoursSuffolk & Ipswich League
Senior Division champions 1974–75, 2014-15, 2015–16, 2018-19
Division One champions 2001–02
Division Three champions 1935–36, 1998–99
League Cup winners 2004–05 2010-11, 2012-13, 2017-18
Suffolk Senior Cup 
Winners 1970–71, 1973–74, 1981–82, 1983–84

Records
Best FA Vase performance: Second round, 1983–84

References

External links
Official website

Defunct football clubs in England
Defunct football clubs in Suffolk
Sport in Ipswich
Suffolk and Ipswich Football League
2021 disestablishments in England
Association football clubs disestablished in 2021